Francesco Maria II della Rovere (20 February 1549 – 23 April 1631) was the last Duke of Urbino.

Biography 

Born at Pesaro, Francesco Maria was the son of Guidobaldo II della Rovere, Duke of Urbino, Count of  Montefeltro and Vittoria Farnese , Princess of Parma. He was raised between 1565 and 1568 at the Royal court of Philip II of Spain. While there he met a Spanish girl and informed his father of his intention to marry her
. But his father would not allow it and demanded he return to Urbino. In 1570 Francesco Maria married Lucrezia d'Este, a daughter of Ercole II d'Este. His father died only a few years later, in 1574, and Francesco Maria succeeded his father as Duke of Urbino.

By 1580 the family estate was in crisis and Francesco Maria was forced to sell his family's titles – the Duchy of Sora and Arce – for 100,000 scudi to Giacomo Boncompagni.

Francesco Maria's marriage, though, remained childless and Francesco Maria needed a male heir. Without one, his family's remaining titles would lapse on his death and his entire estate would be acquired, by default, by the Papal States.

So in 1599, after the death of first wife Lucrezia, he married his cousin Livia della Rovere, 36 years his junior. On 16 May 1605 their long-expected and only child Federico Ubaldo was born.

Federico Ubaldo married Claudia de' Medici in 1621 and was made Duke by his father. However, Federico died in 1623 from an epileptic attack, leaving only a daughter, Vittoria Della Rovere, wife of Ferdinando II de' Medici, Grand Duke of Tuscany; their child was Cosimo III de' Medici, Grand Duke of Tuscany; none of Cosimo III's children had heirs.

The aging Francesco Maria took up the title of Duke again, but as there was no more hope for a male heir, he gave his Duchy to Pope Urban VIII in 1625. The Pope's nephew Taddeo Barberini took control of the duchy which was annexed to the Papal States after Francesco's death at Urbania in 1631. The last member of the della Rovere family, Vittoria, inherited the Duke's art collection and had it transferred to Florence to the Uffizi Gallery.

Marriages

Lucrezia d'Este on 19 January 1570, daughter of Ercole II d'Este, Duke of Ferrara and Renée of France.
Livia della Rovere on 29 April 1599, daughter of Ippolito della Rovere and Isabella Vitelli dei Signori dell'Amatrice.

Issue

Federico Ubaldo della Rovere (16 May 1605 – 28 June 1623) son of Livia della Rovere, was Duke of Urbino and the father of Vittoria della Rovere.

Gallery

References and notes

1549 births
1631 deaths
Francesco Maria 2
People from Pesaro
Francesco Maria 2
Francesco Maria 2
16th-century Italian nobility
17th-century Italian nobility